In written Burmese, the letters of the English alphabet are transcribed according to how the name of the letter sounds to the Burmese ear.

References

Burmese language
English orthography
Transliteration
Latin-script representations
Spelling alphabets